Crime with Father is an early American police drama that aired on ABC on Friday nights from August 31, 1951, to January 18, 1952.

Plot
The series centered on Captain Jim Riland of the homicide squad, and his daughter Chris, who "had a knack for crime-solving" and often helped him solve cases when the police were stymied.

Personnel and sponsor
Rusty Lane portrayed Captain Jim Riland, and Peggy Lobbin played Chris Riland. The writer was Larry Menkin, the producer was Wilbur Stark, and the director was Charles S. Durbin.

For its first three weeks, the program was sustaining. Thereafter, Block Drug Company became the sponsor, advertising Ammident, Minipoo shampoo, Pycope brushes, and other products. Block's sponsorship ended in early November 1951.

Reception
A review in the trade publication Billboard said that the father-daughter crime solvers premise "has the making of a solid mystery-team trend", but the episode critiqued "was marred by trite scripting and melodramatic thesping".

References

External links

1951 American television series debuts
1952 American television series endings
American Broadcasting Company original programming
1950s American crime drama television series
Black-and-white American television shows